Willow Township is a township in 
Monona County, Iowa, USA.

References

Populated places in Monona County, Iowa
Townships in Iowa